Qemal is a masculine given name. It may refer to:

Qemal Butka (1907–1997), Albanian architect, painter, politician, and postage stamp engraver
Qemal Haxhihasani (1916–1991), Albanian historian and folklorist
Qemal Karaosmani (1875–1948), signatory of the Albanian Declaration of Independence, activist of Albanian education
Qemal Karosmani, Albanian politician and mayor of Elbasan in 1939
Qemal Mullai, 19th-century Albanian politician
Qemal Mustafaraj (born 1995), Albanian professional footballer
Qemal Omari, Turkish former football player, manager and referee who was of Albanian heritage
Qemal Stafa (1920–1942), founding member of the Albanian Communist Party, and the leader of its youth section
Ismail Qemal bey Vlora (1844–1919), leader of the Albanian national movement
Qemal Vogli (1929–2004), Albanian footballer
Qemal Bey Vrioni (1885–1946), Albanian political figure of 1930s and 1940s

See also
Qemal Stafa High School, high school, located in Tirana, Albania
Qemal Stafa Stadium, the largest football stadium in Tirana, Albania

Albanian masculine given names